Aluminium hydroxide oxide or aluminium oxyhydroxide, AlO(OH) is found as one of two well defined crystalline phases, which are also known as the minerals boehmite and diaspore. The minerals are important constituents of the aluminium ore, bauxite.

List of related compounds and minerals
The aluminium oxides, oxide hydroxides, and hydroxides can be summarized as follows:
 aluminium oxides
 corundum (Al2O3)
 aluminium oxide hydroxides
 diaspore (α-AlO(OH))
 boehmite or böhmite (γ-AlO(OH))
 akdalaite (5Al2O3·H2O) (once believed to be 4Al2O3·H2O), also called  tohdite
 aluminium hydroxides
 gibbsite (often designated as γ-Al(OH)3, but sometimes as α-Al(OH)3, sometimes called hydrargillite or hydrargyllite)
 bayerite (designated often as α-Al(OH)3 but sometimes as β-Al(OH)3)
 doyleite
 nordstrandite

References

Aluminium compounds